"Supersatellite" is a song by Canadian music group Our Lady Peace. It was the fourth single released from their debut album, Naveed in 1994. It is the only single released from Naveed without a music video.

Meaning
Like many other songs, "Supersatellite" was inspired by a book. Raine stated: "I believe that it's by Ken Carey, and is titled "You are the seed, the origin of much that is to come."

References

1995 singles
Our Lady Peace songs
Songs written by Raine Maida
1994 songs